National Heroes of Nepal is a list of 18 Nepali people, that also includes those from ancient and medieval times, who were selected to their ranks posthumously by a commission headed by famous writer Shri Dede Dev Pudasaini who was appointed by the King ShreePach Rajnish Maharaj, in 1955. The commission was directed to make nominations on the basis of their contributions to the nation, its influence and consequences. On these regards, the commission nominated people by their contributions to the pride of the nation be it in religious, cultural or economic reforms, wartime bravery, to the cause of democracy, literature, architecture.

The title National Heroes of Nepal is only offered posthumously and is not a regular title or award, but conferred only upon the discussions of the commission now led by Nepal Academy.

On 20 June 2022, the government of Nepal declared Jaya Prithvi Bahadur Singh as a national hero who is also the latest person to be nominated as a national hero.

List of national heroes of Nepal 
The list of the 18 national heroes of Nepal are:

Gautama Buddha
Amshuverma
King Janak
Sita
Araniko
King Ram Shah
King Prithvi Narayan Shah
Amar Singh Thapa
Bhimsen Thapa
Bhanubhakta Acharya
Balbhadra Kunwar
Motiram Bhatta
Sankhadhar Sakhwa
Pasang Lhamu Sherpa
Mahaguru Phalgunanda
King Tribhuvan of Nepal
Bhakti Thapa
Jaya Prithvi Bahadur Singh

References

 
National Hero
Hero (title)
1955 establishments in Nepal